Ricardo Jorge Martins Teixeira (born 7 June 2001) is a Portuguese professional footballer who plays as a centre-back for Portuguese club Benfica B.

Career
Teixeira is a youth product of the academies of Alfa AC and Leixões. He began his senior career with Leixões in the Liga Portugal 2 in 2021. He made his professional debut with Leixões in a 2-1 league match against Académica de Coimbra on 22 May 2021. On 2 September 2022, he transferred to Benfica B for €300,000, signing a contract until 2026.

References

External links

2001 births
Living people
Footballers from Porto
Portuguese footballers
Association football defenders
Liga Portugal 2 players
Leixões S.C. players
S.L. Benfica B players